Rupert Frederick Cooper (10 July 1886 – 14 March 1957) was an Australian rules footballer who played with Essendon in the Victorian Football League (VFL).

Notes

External links 

1886 births
1957 deaths
Australian rules footballers from Geelong
Essendon Football Club players